Namaw may refer to several places in Burma:

Namaw, Hkamti
Namaw, Hsi Hseng